Paul Miki, SJ (Japanese: パウロ三木 (Pauro Miki (三木 means "three wood")); c. 1562 – 5 February 1597) was a Japanese Catholic Jesuit, one of the Twenty-six Martyrs of Japan.

Biography

Paul Miki was born into a wealthy Japanese family. He was educated by the Jesuits in Azuchi and Takatsuki. He joined the Society of Jesus and became a well known and successful preacher – gaining numerous converts to Catholicism. The ruler of Japan, Toyotomi Hideyoshi, began persecuting Catholics for fear of the Jesuits' influence and intentions, and possibly that of European visitors.

Miki was arrested and jailed with his fellow Catholics, who were later forced to march 966 kilometers (600 miles) from Kyoto to Nagasaki; all the while singing the Te Deum. On arriving in Nagasaki – which today has the largest Catholic population in Japan – Miki had his chest pierced with a lance while tied to a cross on 5 February 1597. 

He preached his last sermon from the cross, and it is maintained that he forgave his executioners. Crucified alongside him were Joan Soan (de Gotó) and Santiago Kisai, also of the Society of Jesus; along with twenty-three other clergy and laity, all of whom were canonized by Pope Pius IX in 1862.

See also 

 Twenty-six Martyrs of Japan

References

External links 

 THE MARTYRS OF JAPAN – Feast: February 6

Jesuit saints
Canonizations by Pope Pius IX
1560s births
1597 deaths
Date of birth unknown
26 Martyrs of Japan
Japanese Jesuits
Japanese Roman Catholics
Japanese Roman Catholic saints
Jesuit martyrs
16th-century Christian saints
Beatifications by Pope Urban VIII